Neowerdermannia is a genus of South American cacti.

Species
The genus comprises only two species:

References

Cactoideae genera
Notocacteae